The Society for Ethics Across the Curriculum (SEAC) is a non-profit learned society based in the United States. Established in 1992, its mission is to stimulate scholarship on ethics and the teaching of ethics in all academic disciplines. The society sponsors the development of ethics-related resources for academic use; holds an annual conference; and produces the scholarly journal Teaching Ethics. The society's activities are supported in part by the Fund for the Improvement of Post-Secondary Education. The society's memberships and its journal are managed by the Philosophy Documentation Center.

Online resources for members
SEAC members have online access to the following publications to support their research:
 Teaching Ethics, 2001–present
 Professional Ethics, 1992-2003
 Business and Professional Ethics Journal, 1981–present

Annual meetings
The annual meetings of the Society for Ethics Across the Curriculum is held each Fall at a different location in the United States.

References

External links

 SEAC membership registration

Learned societies of the United States
Professional ethics
Organizations established in 1992
Ethics organizations
Philosophical societies in the United States